Kralice may refer to:

Music
Kraliçe, an album of Turkish singer Hande Yener

Places in the Czech Republic
Kralice, a village and part of Chlístovice in the Central Bohemian Region
Kralice na Hané, a market town in the Olomouc Region
Kralice nad Oslavou, a municipality and village in the Vysočina Region
Bible of Kralice (Kralice Bible), printed in the village

See also
Krallice, an American band